The Korean Unification Flag is a flag designed to represent all of Korea when North and South Korea participate as one team in sporting events.

History
North and South Korea initially planned to compete as one team at the 1990 Asian Games, and conceived the Korean Unification Flag amid logistical difficulties with raising two flags at once. While the unified team effort was not realized, the flag was prominently displayed by an unofficial cheerleading group during the Games.

The flag was first officially used in 1991 when the two countries competed together as a single team in the 41st World Table Tennis Championships in Chiba, Japan.

Design
The background is white. In the center is a sky blue silhouette of the Korean Peninsula, including Jeju Island to the southwest. The silhouette is a slightly smoothed version of the actual coastline and northern border; according to both Koreas, the shape of the peninsula is "symbolic" and several smaller islands such as Geojedo are visibly omitted. The agreement creating the flag explicitly excluded Maando, Marado, and Dokdo/Liancourt Rocks (the Koreas' westernmost, southernmost, and easternmost islands).

Variations
Ulleungdo was added to the flag in 2002, and the disputed Liancourt Rocks were added in 2003.

Around September 2006, Socotra Rock was also added to the flag after an EEZ dispute flare-up with China. It is unconfirmed whether it was present at any future official or unofficial usages of the flag.

Ulleungdo and the Liancourt Rocks were removed in an official capacity at the 2018 Winter Olympics and other events in 2018, following alleged pressure from the IOC and Japan. The IOC has told South Korea that including the Liancourt Rocks officially would be seen as "a political act" and violate the IOC's neutrality, to which South Korea agreed. Japan allegedly pressured South Korea to officially remove Ulleungdo as well, citing the "Chiba precedent" (where the flag's first official use, in Chiba, did not include it). Ulleungdo was added back in 2019.

According to South Korean government policy, it allows use of the Liancourt Rocks variation during private events or by people in an unofficial capacity, including cheerleaders. For example, in the 2018 Winter Olympics, the variation was used on the women's ice hockey team's training uniforms, by the North Korean cheerleading groups during the opening ceremony, and during the team's evaluation match five days prior to the opening ceremony (which was hosted by the Korea Ice Hockey Association and not officially part of the Olympic schedule). Japan has protested these uses. Additionally, it appeared on the team's official (non-training) uniforms four days before the opening ceremony; BBC reported that it was quickly removed following media attention, while Yonhap News Agency reported that it was not removed until just before opening ceremony entry.

Usage

Sport

The Korean Unification Flag has been officially used at several international events, either for a unified team, or when the two teams march together in the opening ceremony while competing separately.

At the 1990 Asian Games in Beijing and the 2005 Asian Athletics Championships in Incheon, South Korea, unofficial cheerleading groups also prominently displayed the flag.

In addition to international events, inter-Korean sporting events have used the Unification Flag.

The flag was not used in the 2008 Summer Olympics in Beijing, China. Not only was a unified team shelved, but the Beijing Organizing Committee for the Olympic Games (BOCOG)'s plan to make the two Korean teams enter consecutively during the opening ceremony was rejected due to opposition by the North Korean delegation at the last moment.

During the 2018 Winter Paralympics, negotiations were stalled by North Korean officials requesting that the Liancourt Rocks be included on the flag.

Other contexts

Other occasions on which the flag were used include the following:
 The flag was prominently displayed at the border between the two sides when South Korean president, Roh Moo-hyun, walked into North Korea on an official visit in 2007.
 In 2010, a large group of North Korean citizens and officials waved the flag when saying goodbye to South Korean Reverend Han Sang-ryol returning to South Korea from North Korea by crossing the DMZ line, but he was immediately arrested upon his return to South Korea.
 In 2012, a large group of North Korean citizens and officials waved the flag when saying goodbye to Ro Su-hui, vice-chairman of the Reunification of the Fatherland Union (Pomminryon). This was on the occasion of his return to South Korea from North Korea by crossing the DMZ line. Media reports referred to the flag as the “Korea is one” flag. He was immediately arrested upon his return to South Korea (the moment he stepped over the border mark of the two Koreas) and later jailed.

Symbolism
According to American scholar and Korea expert Brian Reynolds Myers, South and North Koreans view the flag in different contexts. South Koreans see the flag as representing a peaceful relationship and coexistence with North Korea, whereas North Koreans view its usage by South Koreans as representing a desire to have their country annexed into North Korea. In this sense, Myers says, South Korean usage of the flag is more detrimental to their country's status vis-à-vis North Korea than North Koreans' usage of it in regards to South Korea.

See also

 Chinese Taipei Olympic flag
 Proposed flags of Taiwan
 United Team of Germany
 Division of Korea
 Flag of North Korea
 Flag of South Korea
 Korean reunification

References

External links 

 North & South Korea, Sydney 2000 (page on non-national Olympic flags)
 Relationship between South and North Korea in 1990s
 Explanation and detailed design of the Korean Unification Flag 
 North, South Agree to Add Dokdo to the Korean Unification Flag 
 Korean Unification Studies

Sport in Korea
National symbols of Korea
Flags of Korea
Flags of South Korea
Flags of North Korea
North Korea–South Korea relations
Flags introduced in 1991
1991 in South Korea
1991 in North Korea
2018 in South Korea
2018 Winter Olympics